Vikrāntavarman IV (Chinese: 陽補孤施離皮蘭德加拔麻曡; pinyin: Yáng Bǔ Gū Shīlí Pílándéjiābámádié), was a king of Champa, allegedly reigning from 1030 to 1041. Pílándéjiābámádié succeeded after a king named Yang Pu Ku Sri (Chinese: 楊卜俱室離, pinyin: Yáng Bǔ Jù Shìlí).

In October 1030, Vikrantavarman IV sent a diplomatic delegation to the emperor of China, along with tributes of enormous amount of exotic putchuk (Dolomiaea costus or Indian costus), turtle shells, frankincense, ivory, rhino horns. His reign was apparently struggling with hardship and nothing more is known about him.

His succeeding son and crown prince was Jaya Simhavarman II (r. 1041–1044).

Notes

References

Bibliography
 

Kings of Champa
11th-century Vietnamese monarchs
1041 deaths